Phiditia scriptigera is a moth in the Phiditiidae family. It was described by Paul Dognin in 1916.

References

Bombycoidea
Moths described in 1916